Khiron is a village and corresponding community development block in Rae Bareli district, Uttar Pradesh, India. Located on the main Raebareli-Unnao road, Khiron is an old Muslim town that historically served as the seat of a pargana. As of 2011, the village has a population of 9,955, in 1,714 households. It has six primary schools and one medical clinic. It serves as the headquarters of a nyaya panchayat that also includes 11 other villages.

Khiron hosts an annual mela at the Balbhadreshwar Mahadeo temple on Phalguna Badi 13; the festival is part of Shivratri and is dedicated to the worship of Shiva. Vendors bring various everyday items to sell at the fair. Khiron also hosts markets twice per week, on Mondays and Thursdays; the main items traded are cloth and vegetables.

History 
Khiron was fortified and made the seat of a pargana during the reign of Asaf-ud-Daula; the headquarters had previously been at Satanpur since its foundation and fortification by the Bais raja Sathna. Khiron was also historically the seat of a taluqdari estate belonging to a Janwar dynasty, and there were also several Kayasth qanungo families, including many descended from Rai Sahib Rai, who had been a chakladar under the Nawabs of Awadh. Rai Sahib Rai had built a fort at Khiron whose ruins still exist. There is also the tomb of Fateh Shahid, a companion of the Muslim folk hero Sayyid Salar Masud.

The population of Khiron declined sharply in the late 1800s from 3,408 in 1869 to 2,669 in 1901. At the 1901 census, there were 559 Muslims, almost entirely Pathans. Turn-of-the-century Khiron had a large primary school, a cattle pound, a branch post office, and two bazars called Balbhaddarganj and Raghunathganj, holding markets twice per week. There was a large tank to the north and east of the town, as well as some kankar quarries and plenty of orchards.

The 1951 census recorded Khiron as comprising 10 hamlets, with a total population of 2,939 people (1,474 male and 1,465 female), in 593 households and 593 physical houses. The area of the village was given as s. 338 residents were literate, 295 male and 43 female. The village was listed as belonging to the pargana of Khiron and the thana of Gurbakshganj.

The 1961 census recorded Khiron as comprising 10 hamlets, with a total population of 3,210 people (1,679 male and 1,531 female), in 590 households and 536 physical houses. The area of the village was given as s and it had a post office at that point. There was a dispensary run by a local body with five male beds and one female bed; It had one grain mill, and four small manufacturers of clothing. Average attendance of market was 500 and for the festival it was 400.

The main staple foods were listed as wheat and rice.

The 1991 census recorded Khiron as having a total population of 6,296 people (3,317 male and 2,979 female), in 1,127 households and 1,124 physical houses. Members of the 0-6 age group numbered 1,262, or 20% of the total; this group was 52% male (658) and 48% female (604). Members of scheduled castes numbered 2,029, or 32% of the village's total population, while no members of scheduled tribes were recorded. The literacy rate of the village was 35% (1,581 men and 642 women). 1,757 people were classified as main workers (1,613 men and 144 women), while 213 people were classified as marginal workers (all women); the remaining 4,326 residents were non-workers. The breakdown of main workers by employment category was as follows: 828 cultivators (i.e. people who owned or leased their own land); 290 agricultural labourers (i.e. people who worked someone else's land in return for payment); 27 workers in livestock, forestry, fishing, hunting, plantations, orchards, etc.; 0 in mining and quarrying; 42 household industry workers; 66 workers employed in other manufacturing, processing, service, and repair roles; 12 construction workers; 200 employed in trade and commerce; 34 employed in transport, storage, and communications; and 258 in other services.

Villages 
Khiron CD block has the following 94 villages:

References 

Villages in Raebareli district
Community development blocks in India
Former zamindari estates in Uttar Pradesh